Franz Mandl (4 August 1916 in Vienna – 4 February 1988) was an Austrian football (soccer) player who competed in the 1936 Summer Olympics. He was part of the Austrian team, which won the silver medal in the football tournament. He played one match as forward and scored one goal.

References

External links
Franz Mandl Olympic medals and stats

1916 births
1988 deaths
Austrian footballers
Footballers at the 1936 Summer Olympics
Olympic footballers of Austria
Olympic silver medalists for Austria
Austria international footballers
Olympic medalists in football
First Vienna FC players
Medalists at the 1936 Summer Olympics
Association football forwards